Yulin Xisha Airport is a former airport in Yulin, Shaanxi China. The official Yulin airport codes were changed to the new Yulin Yuyang Airport when the latter was opened in March 2008.

Yulin Xisha Airport was the first airport in Yulin, officially opened in 1988, but the planned expansion of the airport was cancelled when it failed to meet the requirements for new developments. Instead, the construction of a new airport was ordered and Yulin Xisha Airport has been demolished.

The airport has one runway (15/33) that is approximately 1,500 metres long.

See also
List of airports in China
List of the busiest airports in China

References

Airports in Shaanxi
Defunct airports in China
2008 disestablishments in China
Yulin, Shaanxi